We Are Not Married (French: Nous ne sommes pas mariés) is a 1946 French-Italian comedy film directed by Bernard-Roland and Gianni Pons and starring Louise Carletti, Claude Dauphin and Loris Gizzi.

Cast
 Louise Carletti as Simone 
 Claude Dauphin as Fernand  
 Loris Gizzi 
 Robert Arnoux as Camille  
 Liliane Bert as Evelyne  
 Roland Toutain as Jimmy  
 Corinne Calvet as Le modèle 
 Nina Myral 
 Philippe Olive as Dubois l'aîné

References

Bibliography 
 Rège, Philippe. Encyclopedia of French Film Directors, Volume 1. Scarecrow Press, 2009.

External links 
 

1946 films
1946 comedy films
French comedy films
Italian comedy films
1940s French-language films
French black-and-white films
Films directed by Bernard-Roland
1940s Italian films
1940s French films